RRR is the soundtrack album, composed by M. M. Keeravani, to the 2022 Indian Telugu-language epic action drama film of the same name, directed by S. S. Rajamouli, starring N. T. Rama Rao Jr., Ram Charan, Ajay Devgn, Alia Bhatt, and Olivia Morris while Samuthirakani, Shriya Saran, Ray Stevenson, and Alison Doody play supporting roles. The film featured seven tracks with lyrics written by Sirivennela Seetharama Sastry, Chandrabose, Suddala Ashok Teja, Ramajogayya Sastry, K. Shiva Dutta and Keeravani himself. Madhan Karky (Tamil), Riya Mukherjee and Varun Grover (Hindi), Mankombu Gopalakrishnan (Malayalam) and Varadaraj Chikkaballapura (Kannada), wrote lyrics for the dubbed versions. The album, was released by Lahari Music and T-Series on 16 April 2022.

Production 

Rajamouli's cousin and norm collaborator M. M. Keeravani was recruited to score for the film. Music sittings began during March 2019, at the special manduva house constructed nearby, a specially erected set at the Aluminium factory in Hyderabad. Suddala Ashok Teja was hired as few of the primary lyricists in the same period. In September 2019, he wrote the lyrics for two songs of the Telugu version's soundtrack.

On 21 September 2020, he announced through his Twitter account that work on the film's music has been paused for a while due to the COVID-19 pandemic lockdown in India. Music sessions resumed in early 2021. In April 2021, Vishal Mishra joined the session and worked for a single of the album along with Keeravani at a recording studio in Hyderabad. On 20 July 2021, Amit Trivedi announced that he recorded a song in the soundtrack album. On the same day, Keeravani announced that a young singer named Prakruthi recorded a song in the album. The same month, Anirudh Ravichander also recorded one song for the film. In July 2021, T-Series and Lahari Music acquired the audio rights of RRR in five languages, reportedly at an amount of 25 crore.

Marketing and release 
The first single was released on 1 August 2021, coinciding with Friendship Day. The music video was directed by S. S. Karthikeya and was released as "Dosti" (in Telugu, Hindi and Kannada), "Natpu" (in Tamil), and "Priyam" (in Malayalam) with vocals by Vedala Hemachandra in Telugu, Amit Trivedi in Hindi, Anirudh Ravichander in Tamil, Vijay Yesudas in Malayalam and Yazin Nizar in Kannada. In addition, N. T. Rama Rao Jr. and Ram Charan made cameo appearances in the music video. The promotional music video of the first track "Dosti" was filmed at a specially constructed set at Annapurna Studios. On 10 November 2021, the second single titled "Naatu Naatu" (in Telugu), "Naacho Naacho" (in Hindi), "Naatu Koothu" (in Tamil), "Haali Naatu" (in Kannada) and "Karinthol" (in Malayalam) was released. The song received positive response for the choreography performed by Ram Charan and N. T. Rama Rao Jr., and became the album's most-viewed song in YouTube.

On 26 November, the third single titled as "Janani", in all languages, except for Tamil, whose version was titled "Uyire", was released, featuring vocals by M. M. Keeravani. A special preview of the track was held at PVR RK Cineplex in Hyderabad, with Rajamouli and Keeravani attending the event, the former called the track as the "soul of the film". On 24 December, the fourth song "Komuram Bheemudo" was released highlighting Rama Rao's character in the film, while serving as a tribute to the freedom fighter Komaram Bheem. It was released in the same title in Hindi, "Komuram Bheemudho" in Kannada" and "Komuram Bheemano" in Tamil and Malayalam. The fifth song, "Ramam Raghavam" was released on 31 December 2021, coinciding New Year's Eve. The song revolves around Charan's characterisation as Alluri Sitarama Raju.

On 14 March 2022, the track "Etthara Jenda" (in Telugu), "Sholay" (in Hindi), "Koelae" (in Tamil), "Etthuva Jenda" (in Kannada)" and "Etthuka Jenda" (in Malayalam), was released as a single. A promotional track, featuring Charan, Rama Rao and Alia Bhatt, the song was played during the end credits of the film. After the film's release, Keeravani assured fans about the release of the track, "Komma Uyyala" which was positively received. The track was later released as part of the full album on 16 April 2022.

Track listing

Album credits

Original Soundtrack 
Credits adapted from Lahari Music

Songwriter(s) 
 M. M. Keeravani (Composer, Arranger)

Performer(s) 
 Composition, production, musical arrangements, recording, mixing, mastering – M. M. Keeravani 
 Lyrics – Sirivennela Seetharama Sastry, Madhan Karky, Riya Mukherjee, Mankombu Gopalakrishnan, Azad Varadaraj, Chandrabose, M. M. Keeravaani, Varun Grover, Varadaraj Chikkaballapura, K. Shiva Dutta
 Singers – Vedala Hemachandra, Anirudh Ravichander, Amit Trivedi, Vijay Yesudas, Yazin Nizar, Kaala Bhairava, Rahul Sipligunj, Vishal Mishra, K. S. Harisankar, M.M. Keeravani, Vijay Prakash, Chandana Bala Kalyan, Charu Hariharan, Benny Dayal, Prudhvi Chandra, Hymath Mohammed, Sahithi, Harika Narayan, Raag Patel, Nayana Nair, Prakruthi Reddy

Background score 
All music is composed and conducted by M.M. Keeravani.

See also 

 List of accolades received by RRR

References 

2022 soundtrack albums
Telugu film soundtracks
Tamil film soundtracks
M. M. Keeravani soundtracks
T-Series (company) soundtrack albums
Hindi film soundtracks
Malayalam film soundtracks
Kannada film soundtracks
Action film soundtracks